UFC Fight Night 226 (also known as UFC on ESPN+ 84) is an upcoming mixed martial arts event produced by the Ultimate Fighting Championship that will take place on June 3, 2023, at a TBD venue and location.

Announced bouts 
Women's Bantamweight bout: Miesha Tate vs. Mayra Bueno Silva
Flyweight bout: Kai Kara-France vs. Amir Albazi
Flyweight bout: Tim Elliott vs. Allan Nascimento

See also 

 List of UFC events
 List of current UFC fighters
 2023 in UFC

References 

 

UFC Fight Night
2023 in mixed martial arts
Scheduled mixed martial arts events